The  is a  Biblical garden, one of a number botanical gardens located across the campus of Seinan Gakuin University, Nishijin 6-2-92, Sawara-ku, Fukuoka, Fukuoka, Japan. It is open daily.

The garden that contains about 80 plants mentioned in the Bible, with labels in the Hebrew, Greek, Latin, English, and Japanese, as well as a reference to the Biblical passage in which the plant is mentioned.

Exhibits
The collection includes:
 
  Abies firma
  Aloe arborescens var. natalensis
  Aloe vera
  Anemone coronaria
  Anethum graveolens
  Brassica nigra
  Cinnamomum verum
  Cistus creticus
  Coriandrum sativum
  Crocus sativus
  Cuminum cyminum
  Cupressus sempervirens
  Cyperus papyrus
  Echinops ritro
  Ficus carica
  Foeniculum vulgare
  Gossypium herbaceum
  Hedera helix
  Hordeum vulgare
  Hyoscyamus spp.
  Hyoscyamus aureus
  Hyssopus officinalis
  Laurus nobilis
  Lavandula stoechas
  Lawsonia inermis
  Lens culinaris
  Lilium candidum
  Linum usitatissimum
  Lolium temulentum
  Lycium chinense
  Majorana syriaca
  Mentha longifolia
  Micromeria fruticosa
  Morus nigra
  Myrtus communis
  Nerium oleander
  Nicotiana glauca
  Nigella sativa
  Olea europaea
  Ornithogalum spp.
  Phoenix dactylifera
  Phragmites australis
  Pinus densiflora
  Populus nigra 'Italica'
  Prunus dulcis
  Punica granatum
  Quercus calliprinos
  Quercus glauca
  Ricinus communis
  Rosa canina
  Rosa hybrida
  Rosa phoenicia
  Rubia tinctorum
  Ruta chalepensis
  Salvia fruticosa
  Salvia hierosolymitana
  Silybum marianum
  Sternbergia clusiana
  Trachycarpus fortunei
  Triticum aestivum
  Urtica urens
  Vitis vinifera
  Zelkova serrata
  Zizyphus spina-christi

See also 
 List of botanical gardens in Japan

References 
 Seinan Gakuin University Biblical Botanical Garden (Japanese)
 Jardins Botaniques Japonais (French)

Botanical gardens in Japan
Gardens in Fukuoka Prefecture
Bible-themed museums, zoos, and botanical gardens